Humaid Abdulla Saleh (Arabic:حميد عبد الله صالح) (born 7 April 1996) is an Emirati footballer who plays as a winger.

Career

Al-Shaab
Humaid Saleh started his career at Al-Shaab and is a product of the Al-Shaab's youth system. On 7 February 2014, Humaid Saleh made his professional debut for Al-Shaab against Al-Ahli in the Pro League, replacing Ahmad Eisa Kamil.

Al-Sharjah
He was playing with Al-Shaab and after merging Al-Sharjah, and Al-Shaab clubs under the name Al-Sharjah he was joined to Al-Sharjah.

Ajman
On 8 September 2018, left Al-Sharjah and signed with Ajman. On 13 December 2018, Humaid Abdulla made his professional debut for Ajman against Al-Dhafra in the Pro League, replacing Mohammed Ahmad.

External links

References

1996 births
Living people
Emirati footballers
Al-Shaab CSC players
Sharjah FC players
Ajman Club players
UAE Pro League players
UAE First Division League players
Association football wingers
Place of birth missing (living people)